The ceremonial county of Leicestershire (which includes the unitary authority of Leicester), is divided into 10 parliamentary constituencies - 3 borough constituencies and 7 county constituencies. One of these also includes the small historic county of Rutland, which was administratively a district of Leicestershire from 1974 to 1997. Since 1997, Rutland has been a separate unitary authority.

Constituencies

Historic constituencies 
In the unreformed House of Commons, Leicestershire and Rutland were represented by two Knights of the Shire each, and the only parliamentary borough was Leicester, which sent two burgesses.

Under the Reform Act 1832, Leicestershire was split into two divisions, North and South, which each elected two members.  The Reform Act 1885 redistributed these seats into four single-member divisions: Melton, or Eastern, Loughborough, or Mid, Harborough, or Southern, and Bosworth, or Western.

At the 1918 general election, the four divisions of the county were retained, and the borough of Leicester was split into three single-member constituencies, Leicester East, Leicester South, and Leicester West.  From 1950 to 1974 Leicester had four constituencies, these being Leicester North East, Leicester North West, Leicester South East and Leicester South West: the three seat arrangement of South, East and West was reverted to thereafter.

Rutland constituted a constituency on its own until 1918, when it became part of the Rutland and Stamford constituency, with nearby Stamford in Lincolnshire.

In 1983, seats in Leicestershire were redrawn.  Rutland was merged with Melton to form Rutland and Melton, with Loughborough, Bosworth, and Harborough remaining as seat names. The new North West Leicestershire constituency was created.  A further constituency, Charnwood was created in the north for the 1997 election.

2010 boundary changes 
In the Fifth Review the Boundary Commission for England recommended that Leicestershire retained its current constituencies, with minor changes only to reflect revisions to local authority ward boundaries. Although virtually unchanged, Blaby was renamed South Leicestershire on the grounds that it does not match the borders of Blaby district, and the village of Blaby itself is not one of the major population centres.

Proposed boundary changes 
See 2023 Periodic Review of Westminster constituencies for further details.

Following the abandonment of the Sixth Periodic Review (the 2018 review), the Boundary Commission for England formally launched the 2023 Review on 5 January 2021. Initial proposals were published on 8 June 2021 and, following two periods of public consultation, revised proposals were published on 8 November 2022. Final proposals will be published by 1 July 2023.

The commission has proposed including Leicestershire and Rutland with Lincolnshire in a sub-region of the East Midlands region, creating one additional seat by re-establishing the constituency of Rutland and Stamford, which spans all three counties. As a consequence, Rutland and Melton would be abolished, being replaced by Melton and Syston, while a reconfigured Charnwood would be renamed Mid Leicestershire. Bosworth is renamed Hinckley and Bosworth. The following seats are proposed:

Containing electoral wards from Blaby

 Mid Leicestershire (part)
 South Leicestershire (part)

Containing electoral wards from Charnwood

 Loughborough
 Melton and Syston (part)
 Mid Leicestershire (part)

Containing electoral wards from Harborough

 Harborough (part)
 Rutland and Stamford (also comprises the county of Rutland and parts of South Kesteven in Lincolnshire)
 South Leicestershire (part)

Containing electoral wards from Hinckley and Bosworth

 Hinckley and Bosworth (part)
 Mid Leicestershire (part)

Containing electoral wards from Leicester

 Leicester East
 Leicester South
 Leicester West

Containing electoral wards from Melton

 Melton and Syston (part)

Containing electoral wards from North West Leicestershire

 Hinckley and Bosworth (part)
 North West Leicestershire

Containing electoral wards from Oadby and Wigston

 Harborough (part)
Containing electoral wards from Rutland
 Rutland and Stamford (also comprises parts of Harborough and of South Kesteven in Lincolnshire)

Results history
Primary data source: House of Commons research briefing - General election results from 1918 to 2019

2019 
The number of votes cast for each political party who fielded candidates in constituencies comprising Leicestershire and Rutland in the 2019 general election were as follows:

Percentage votes 

11983 & 1987 - SDP-Liberal Alliance

* Included in Other

Seats 

11983 & 1987 - SDP-Liberal Alliance

Maps

Historical representation by party
A cell marked → (with a different colour background to the preceding cell) indicates that the previous MP continued to sit under a new party name.

1885 to 1918

1918 to 1974
From 1918 to 1983 Rutland was categorised with Lincolnshire.

1974 to present

See also
 List of parliamentary constituencies in the East Midlands (region)
East Midlands (European Parliament constituency)
Leicestershire County Council
Rutland County Council

Footnotes

References
General

Specific

Leicestershire
 
 
Parliament
Constituencies